Captain Leslie Tufnell Peacocke (1872 - March 5, 1941) was an actor, screenwriter, and director in the United States.

He was born in Bangalore, British Raj and served in the Connaught Rangers before emigrating to the United States.

In 1919 he wrote on behalf of Democracy Film Corporation about producing a film adaptation of The Souls of Black Folk. His film Injustice was a response to Thomas Dixon Jr.'s The Clansman.

His book Hints on Photoplay Writing from his articles in Photoplay Magazine was published in 1916. A photo of the author appears at the beginning of the book.

His films include adaptations of stories by Florence Herrington.

He was an actor in the 1929 show A Comedy of Women at the Ambassador Theatre.

Filmography

Actor
His Neighbor's Wife (1913) as Captain Roberts 
The Woman Who Dared (1916) as Minister of Foreign Affairs
Bab the Fixer (1917) as John Porter
Betty Be Good (1917) as Jonathan Brownlee
Angel Child (1918) as Glory's father
Shadows of Suspicion (1919) as Chief of Scotland Yard 
The Vanishing Dagger (1920)
Black Beauty (1921) as Lord Wynwaring. Film is partially extant.

Writer
Neptune's Daughter (1914)
Salvation Nell (1915)
Help! (1916) 
The Woman Who Dared (1916)
The Unwritten Law (1916)
The Clean Gun (1917)
Mentioned in Confidence (1917)
The Alien Blood (1917)
Innocence (1917)
The Checkmate (1917)
Brand's Daughter (1917)
Whatever the Cost (1918)
The Heart of Juanita (1919)
Injustice (1919)
Reformation (1919)

Director
Putting One Over on Ignatz (1917)
Good Morning, Nurse! (1917)
It Happened in Room 7 (1917)
O, It's Great to Be Crazy (1918) with Stan Laurel
Reformation (1919), a Sidney P. Dones film
Injustice (1919)
Neptune's Bride (1920)
The Midnight Flower (1923)
The Wheel of Fortune (1923)

References

Film directors from Bangalore
1872 births
1941 deaths
19th-century British Army personnel
British emigrants to the United States
American male screenwriters
American film directors
20th-century American male actors
Male actors from Bangalore
Connaught Rangers officers
American male film actors
Screenwriters from Bangalore